Joe Cobb (1916–2002) was an American child actor.

Joe Cobb may also refer to:
Joe Cobb (baseball) (1895–1947), baseball player
Joe Cobb (footballer) (born 1990), English football defender
Joe Cobb (Arizona politician)
Joe Cobb (racing driver), father of current driver and owner Jennifer Jo Cobb